Song in a Seashell is an album by American country music singer Tom T. Hall released in 1985 on the Mercury label which reached #63 in the country music chart. Three singles from the album charted, “A Bar With No Beer” at #40, “Down in the Florida Keys” at #42 and “Love Letters in the Sand” at #79.

Track listing
All tracks composed by Tom T. Hall; except where indicated
Side 1
"That Lucky Old Sun" (Haven Gillespie, Beasley Smith) – 2:16
"A Bar with No Beer" – 2:52
"I Have Friends – 2:39
"A Song in a Seashell" – 2:05
"Red Sails in the Sunset" (Jimmy Kennedy, Hugh Williams) – 2:50

Side 2
"Down in the Florida Keys" – 2:46
"Love Letters in the Sand" (Fred Coots, Charles Kenny, Nick Kenny) – 2:13
"This Ain’t Exactly What I Had in Mind" – 3:36
"Gone Fishin’" (Nick Kenny, Charles Kenny) – 2:31
"We’re All Through Dancing" – 2:51

Musicians
David Briggs, Hargus "Pig" Robbins - keyboards
Jerry Carrigan, Ron Gannaway - percussion
Ray Edenton, Jerry Kennedy, Pete Wade, Chip Young - guitar
Weldon Myrick - steel guitar
Mike Leech - bass guitar
George Binkley, John Borg, Roy Christensen, Virginia Christensen, Connie Callopy, Charles Everett, Carl Gorodetzky, Lennie Haight, Lee Larrison, Dennis Molchan, Pamela Sixfin, Mark Tanner, Gary Vanosdale, Stephanie Woolf - strings (Nashville String Machine)
Bergen White - string arrangements
The Beach Buch - background vocals on “Down in the Florida Keys"

Production
Produced by: Jerry Kennedy
Recorded and Mixed at: Young ‘Un Sound, Nashville, TN
Engineers: Ron “Snake” Reynolds assisted by Barry Foy
Mastered at: Master Mix, Nashville, TN by Hank Williams
Album Design: Bill Brunt (Private Eye Studio)
Photography: Scott Bonner & Ron Keith

References

1985 albums
Mercury Records albums
Tom T. Hall albums
Albums produced by Jerry Kennedy